The Bréguet-Richet Gyroplane was an early French experimental quadcopter rotary-wing aircraft developed by Bréguet Aviation.

Design and development
The Gyroplane No.I was one of the earliest attempts to create a practical rotary-wing aircraft.  It was designed  by the Bréguet brothers with help from Professor Charles Richet. The aircraft had an uncovered open steel framework with a seat for the pilot and a powerplant at the centre.  Radiating from the central structure were four wire-braced tubular steel arms, each bearing a superimposed pair of four-bladed rotors.  To eliminate the torque effect, two rotor sets were driven clockwise and two counter-clockwise.

Operational service
On 29 September 1907, the Gyroplane No.I was flown for the first time, albeit to an elevation of only . It was not a free flight, as four men were used to steady the structure. It was neither controllable nor steerable, but it was the first time that a rotary-wing device had lifted itself and a pilot into the air. It later flew up to 1.52 m (4.99 ft) above the ground. The design was improved and the Gyroplane No.II appeared the following year. No.II had two two-blade rotors of 7.85 m (25.75 ft) diameter and also had fixed wings. Powered by a 41 kW (55 hp) Renault engine, it was reported to have flown successfully more than once in 1908. No.II was damaged in a heavy landing and was rebuilt as the No.IIbis. It flew at least once in April 1909 before being destroyed when the company's works were badly damaged in a severe storm.

Specifications (No.I)

See also

References

Notes

Bibliography
 Young, Warren R. The Helicopters. "The Epic of Flight". Chicago: Time-Life Books, 1982. .

Gyroplane
1900s French experimental aircraft
1900s French helicopters
Aircraft first flown in 1907
Quadrotors
Single-engined piston helicopters